Nissan Motor Co. (Australia) Pty. Ltd. is the Australian subsidiary of Nissan and a former automobile manufacturer currently headquartered in Mulgrave, Victoria. The company assembled passenger cars of the Japanese brand Nissan.

History
Nissan automobiles were imported to Australia as early as the 1930s. In the early 1960s, the Australian industrialist Lawrence Hartnett became aware of the brand, took over sales and began in 1966 with the assembly of up to 20,000 Bluebirds annually for the Australian market by the Sydney-based Pressed Metal Corporation.

As early as 1968, Nissan was named as a tenant of the closed Volkswagen Australia plant. The Volkswagen subsidiary Motor Producers Limited manufactured Datsun vehicles there from 1968. In 1971, Nissan was able to sell twice as many vehicles as Volkswagen in Australia. The assembly activity was expanded further in 1972.

Following the decision by the Nissan management to meet the Australian government's target of 85% local production, the Clayton plant was to be converted back to full production (instead of assembling kits). Since Volkswagen no longer wanted to invest in the plant, a full takeover of Motor Producers Limited by Nissan was agreed. The local CKD assembly of Volkswagen vehicles was to be carried out under the responsibility of Nissan from April 1976 until it was finally discontinued in March 1977.

Independent production in Clayton began in 1977 with the Datsun 200B. The Australian model had a different rear axle than its Japanese counterpart. Other assembled models were Nissan Gazelle and Nissan Pulsar, which were supplemented by Nissan Skyline and Nissan Pintara in 1986. Nissan's automobile production in Australia ended in 1992. Production had fallen to less than 36,000 vehicles in 1991, after nearly 58,000 were made in 1990.

At Nissan Australia, cast parts are currently still mainly manufactured in a factory that was built in 1982.

In 2009 Nissan launched Nissan Financial Services, a wholly owned subsidiary of Nissan Australia to provide financial services to dealers and customers. Nissan Financial Services Australia Pty Ltd is headed by its managing director Peter Jones.

References 

Nissan
Australian companies established in 1966
Vehicle manufacturing companies established in 1966
Australian subsidiaries of foreign companies
Car manufacturers of Australia
Australian brands
Companies based in Melbourne